The Isle of Man national netball team represents Isle of Man in international netball.

References

 Official webpage

National netball teams of Europe
Netball